Glycine receptor subunit beta is a protein that in humans is encoded by the GLRB gene.

The inhibitory glycine receptor mediates postsynaptic inhibition in the spinal cord and other regions of the central nervous system. It is a pentameric receptor composed of alpha (GLRA1, MIM 138491; GLRA2, MIM 305990) and beta subunits.[supplied by OMIM]

See also
 Glycine receptor

References

Further reading

External links 
 

Ion channels